Evelia Farina (born 7 October 1941) is an Argentine sprinter. She competed in the women's 4 × 100 metres relay at the 1964 Summer Olympics.

References

1941 births
Living people
Athletes (track and field) at the 1964 Summer Olympics
Argentine female sprinters
Argentine female long jumpers
Olympic athletes of Argentina
Place of birth missing (living people)
20th-century Argentine women